In military organisation, unity of command is the principle that subordinate members of a structure should all be responsible to a single commander.

United States
The military of the United States considers unity of command as one of the twelve principles of joint operations:

Military problems
When the principle of unity of command is violated problems quickly develop. An example occurred in Afghanistan in 2006 when Combined Forces Command-Afghanistan passed control of the ground fight to the International Security Assistance Force.  This caused the operations to split between several unified commanders in charge of U.S. Central Command, the North Atlantic Treaty Organization, and the U.S. Special Operations Command, which caused significant operational problems.

See also
 Chain of command, a clear command structure
 Civilian control of the military
 Command hierarchy
 Division of labor
 Parochialism 
 Span of control
 Staff (military)

References

Military organization